Harry Camp Clark (June 8, 1883 – December 27, 1950) was an American Republican politician  from California.

Early life
Harry Clark was born 1883 in Bay City, Michigan to Herman and Melissa Clark. In 1907 he graduated from the University of Vermont with a degree in Civil Engineering. After graduation, he worked in Massachusetts and Louisville, Kentucky, where he was in charge of building a sewer system.

Legal, political, and military career
In 1911 he moved to San Diego, California to join his mother and two sisters. He took up road surveying and studied law, and was admitted to the bar in 1918. Clark became an able and popular lawyer, and was president of the County Bar Association in 1927. Clark served as mayor of San Diego from 1927 to 1931. He was defeated in 1931, where the main issue was the $8.5 million spent for water projects, such as the Lake Hodges Dam, with little to show for it. Clark served as Deputy City Attorney after his term as mayor.
During World War I, he was second lieutenant of the Quartermaster's Corps and served overseas for a year.  He took part in the Battle of Saint-Mihiel and Meuse-Argonne Offensive.  He was promoted to Captain before he was discharged.

Personal life
On June 6, 1911 Clark married Georgia L. Kessinger in San Diego. She was born May 14, 1876 in Ohio and died December 22, 1963 in San Diego. They had at least one son, Harry C., Jr.
Clark died in 1950 of a heart attack at his home in San Diego.

Further reading 
  Biography, pp. 169–170
 "Harry Camp Clark Succumbs in Home", San Diego Union, December 28, 1950, p. A-6. Includes portrait

1883 births
1950 deaths
Politicians from Bay City, Michigan
Military personnel from California
University of Vermont alumni
Lawyers from San Diego
Mayors of San Diego
California Republicans
20th-century American politicians
20th-century American lawyers